Moxie Ladies is the barbershop quartet that won the Sweet Adelines International Quartet Championship for 2009 on November 7, 2008, in Honolulu, Hawaii. SAI, "one of the world's largest singing organizations for women", has members over five continents who belong to more than 1,200 quartets.

Discography
 Moxie Ladies (CD; 2012)

References

External links
 Official website

Professional a cappella groups
Barbershop quartets
Sweet Adelines International